Dorcadion anatolicum is a species of beetle in the family Cerambycidae. It was described by Pic in 1900. It is known from Turkey. It contains the varietas Dorcadion anatolicum var. subuniforme.

References

anatolicum
Beetles described in 1900